The High Commission of Sri Lanka in Canberra is the diplomatic mission of Sri Lanka to Australia. The high commission is also accredited to Fiji, New Zealand, Papua New Guinea and Vanuatu. The current high commissioner is Somasundaram Skandakumar. His immediate predecessor was Admiral Thisara Samarasinghe, the former Commander of the Sri Lanka Navy.

High Commissioners

References

External links
 

Australia–Sri Lanka relations
Sri Lanka
Canberra